The Miami RedHawks baseball team (formerly the Miami Redskins) is a varsity intercollegiate athletic team of Miami University in Oxford, Ohio, United States. The team is a member of the Mid-American Conference East division, which is part of the National Collegiate Athletic Association's Division I. Miami's first baseball team was fielded in 1915. The team plays its home games at McKie Field at Hayden Park in Oxford, Ohio. The RedHawks are coached by Dan Hayden, who was hired prior to the 2014 season.

RedHawks in Major League Baseball
Since the Major League Baseball Draft began in 1965, Miami has had 74 players selected.

See also
List of NCAA Division I baseball programs

References

External links
 

 
Baseball teams established in 1915
1915 establishments in Ohio